Herman Saftleven the Younger (1609 - 5 January 1685 (buried)), was a Dutch painter of the Baroque period.

Biography

Born in Rotterdam, Saftleven lived most of his life (1632–1685) in Utrecht. His brothers, Cornelis Saftleven (1607–1681)  and Abraham Saftleven were both painters. The former was even better known as a painter, specializing in genre scenes, while Herman was known for his landscapes of river scenes as well as of persons traveling through woods. His father, Herman Saftleven I was a painter in Rotterdam, who died by 1627. One of Herman II’s daughters, Sara Saftleven, born in Utrecht after 1633, also became a painter of flowers in watercolors. She married Jacob Adriaensz Broers in 1671.

Herman became the dean of the Guild of St Luke in Utrecht. After a storm had destroyed most of the town in the 1670s, he sold the city a series drawings he had made of Utrecht churches before they were destroyed. In the 1680s, he was commissioned by the amateur botanist and horticulturalist Agnes Block, to draw flowers and plants at  her country estate near Utrecht.  He died in Utrecht.

References
 Web gallery of Art.
 Grove encyclopedia abstract.
 Herman Zachtleven biography in De groote schouburgh der Nederlantsche konstschilders en schilderessen (1718) by Arnold Houbraken, courtesy of the Digital library for Dutch literature

External links
Herman Saftleven at WikiCommons
Vermeer and The Delft School, a full text exhibition catalog from The Metropolitan Museum of Art, which contains material on Herman Saftleven

1609 births
1685 deaths
Painters from Rotterdam
Artists from Utrecht
Dutch Golden Age painters
Dutch landscape painters
Dutch male painters
Painters from Utrecht
Painters of ruins